Little Silver is a railway station in Little Silver, Monmouth County, New Jersey, United States. It is served by trains on NJ Transit's North Jersey Coast Line. The station is located in between two grade crossings, and trains can back up traffic when they stop at the station.

History
The station was originally built in 1875 by the New York and Long Branch Railroad which was acquired by the Central Railroad of New Jersey. On June 30, 1882, the community became the site of an accident in which 5 of the 7 cars of the NY&LB's Lightning Express train plunged off a trestle bridge, killing 1 man outright, with 2 men dying of their injuries later. Former President Ulysses S. Grant was among the survivors of the accident. The original station house was replaced by the existing station, which was designed by the noted American architect Henry Hobson Richardson prior to his death in 1886, and opened in 1890. The head house has been on the state and federal registers of historic places since 1984 listed as part of the Operating Passenger Railroad Stations Thematic Resource. The station exterior is constructed of sandstone with a slate roof, while the interior features rough wood paneling. It was renovated from 2001 to 2003 with Mark Fitzsimmons as the architect.

Station layout
The station has two low-level asphalt side platforms.

See also
List of New Jersey Transit stations
National Register of Historic Places listings in Monmouth County, New Jersey

References

External links

Station from Sycamore Avenue from Google Maps Street View
Station from Oceanport Avenue from Google Maps Street View

Railway stations in Monmouth County, New Jersey
NJ Transit Rail Operations stations
Railway stations on the National Register of Historic Places in New Jersey
Railway stations in the United States opened in 1875
Little Silver, New Jersey
Henry Hobson Richardson buildings
Richardsonian Romanesque architecture in New Jersey
Stations on the North Jersey Coast Line
National Register of Historic Places in Monmouth County, New Jersey
New Jersey Register of Historic Places
Former New York and Long Branch Railroad stations